The World's Most Dangerous Party was Paul Shaffer's second album, released as a double CD in July 1993. Assembled as if Paul and his band were playing live at a house party, the album features the voices -- but not necessarily singing -- of many celebrities and recording artists like David Letterman, Tony Bennett, George Clinton, Joan Jett, Phil Spector, Mike Myers, Dana Carvey, Jon Lovitz, Richard Belzer and Joe Walsh. As the 'live' music is being played, these celebrities are generally heard within happy chattering crowd noise as if they're at a crowded party, listening to the band play and kibitzing with each other and with Paul.

All songs on the album are covers and most are instrumental, similar to the versions played by Paul Shaffer and his band on David Letterman's late night talk shows. It was produced, engineered, and mixed by rock icon Todd Rundgren. Assistant engineered by Mike Thompson at The Hit Factory recording studios.

Shaffer's band was billed as "The Party Boys of Rock 'n' Roll" because NBC held a trademark on the phrase "World's Most Dangerous Band." (CBS, where the band would arrive later that year, would also hold the trademark on the name the band would use next, the "CBS Orchestra.")

Track listing

Disc 1
 "Doing It to Death" (Intro) (1:15)
 "Something About You" (3:02)
 "I Was Made to Love Her" (3:48)
 "Burning Down the House" (4:28)
 "Mysterious Ways" (4:02)
 "Inner City Blues (Make Me Wanna Holler)" (3:56)
 "Black Dog" (4:31)
 "Doing It to Death" (6:35)
 "Middle of the Road" (3:58)
 "Don't Dream It's Over" (4:37)
 "Could You Be Loved" (4:33)

Disc 2
 "Chest Fever" (3:55)
 "1999" (5:01)
 "Jamp" (6:44)
 "Fantasy" (4:22)
 "(Not Just) Knee Deep" (4:31)
 "Don't Bring Me Down" (5:00)
 "You Shook Me All Night Long" (3:34)
 "Beds are Burning" (4:33)
 "I Can't Make You Love Me" (4:04)
 Medley: "Time Is Tight/Hiphugger/Green Onions/Dance to the Music" (9:35)
 "Dance to the Music" (3:15)

1993 albums
Albums produced by Todd Rundgren
Capitol Records albums